Roly Poly  is an American chain of sandwich stores. They first opened their doors in Atlanta, Georgia, in 1996.

History
The first Roly Poly Sandwich Shop opened in 1997 in the Buckhead section of Atlanta, Georgia. Company founders Linda Wolf and Julie Reid had been rolling sandwiches in their shops in New Canaan, Connecticut (1986) and in Key West, Florida (1997) before building their franchise system.

Number of Locations Over Time 
At one point in the early 2000s they had over 170 locations in 27 states. The chain has since declined to 27 locations as of January 2021.

Current Locations

Alabama 

 Birmingham - Homewood

Georgia 

 Augusta
 Duluth
 Macon
 Savannah

Indiana 

 Bloomington
 Terre Haute

Louisiana 

 Alexandria
 Baton Rouge - Corporate Blvd
Baton Rouge - Coursey
 Baton Rouge - Downtown
 Lafayette
Lake Charles
 New Orleans
Ruston
 Sulphur
 West Monroe

Maryland 

 Annapolis

Michigan 

 Grand Blanc

North Carolina 

 Raleigh

South Carolina 

 Columbia

Texas 

 Dallas

External links
 Roly Poly

References
 The Atlanta Journal article about owning a shop
 Kansas City Star about opening 45 more shops in the Kansas City area.

Companies based in Atlanta
Restaurants in Atlanta
Privately held companies based in Georgia (U.S. state)
Restaurants in Georgia (U.S. state)
Economy of the Eastern United States
Regional restaurant chains in the United States
Fast-food chains of the United States
Restaurants established in 1996
1996 establishments in Georgia (U.S. state)